Abdel Monaim Yahiaoui (born 6 December 1966) is an Algerian weightlifter. He competed at the 1992 Summer Olympics and the 1996 Summer Olympics.

References

External links
 

1966 births
Living people
Algerian male weightlifters
Olympic weightlifters of Algeria
Weightlifters at the 1992 Summer Olympics
Weightlifters at the 1996 Summer Olympics
Place of birth missing (living people)
20th-century Algerian people